The Lincoln Institute of Land Policy is a think tank based in Cambridge, Massachusetts. The Lincoln Institute of Land Policy seeks to "improve quality of life through the effective use, taxation, and stewardship of land". A nonprofit private operating foundation whose origins date to 1946, the Lincoln Institute researches and recommends creative approaches to land as a solution to economic, social, and environmental challenges. Through education, training, publications, and events, the institute integrates theory and practice to inform public policy decisions worldwide.

The organization is currently headed by George W. McCarthy, previously director of Metropolitan Opportunity at the Ford Foundation. In July 2014 he succeeded Gregory K. Ingram, an urban economist and former director of evaluation for the World Bank.

Publications
The Lincoln Institute publishes books and Policy Focus Reports that reflect original research and also document conference proceedings. The current publications catalog lists almost 100 titles, and nearly 1,000 working papers are available online for free downloading. The quarterly magazine Land Lines features articles on a range of land use and tax policy topics. The Lincoln Institute also produces documentary films in the Making Sense of Place series: “Phoenix: The Urban Desert,” “Cleveland: Confronting Decline in an American City,” and "Portland: Quest for the Livable City," and supported the documentary series Shifting Ground produced by David Baron and airing on National Public Radio.

History
The Lincoln Institute of Land Policy was founded in 1974, supported by the Lincoln Foundation, which was established in 1946 by John C. Lincoln.  He was a successful industrialist in Cleveland, Ohio, who among other things patented processes for arc welding and founded the Lincoln Electric Co. The Lincoln Institute and the Lincoln Foundation merged into a single private operating foundation in November 2006. One of the Lincoln Institute’s founding objectives has been to address the links between land policy and social and economic progress first explored by Henry George in his book Progress and Poverty (1879).

Organization
The Institute is organized around the achievement of six goals:

 Low-carbon, climate-resilient communities and regions
 Efficient and equitable tax systems
 Reduced poverty and spatial inequality
 Fiscally healthy communities and regions
 Sustainably managed land and water resources
 Functional land markets and reduced informality

In December 2007, the Lincoln Institute and Peking University established the Center for Urban Development and Land Policy, located on the University’s Beijing campus. The center will play a continuing role in providing information and analysis in the current period of rapid urbanization in China.

In 2017, the institute established the Center for Community Investment, which works to ensure that all communities, especially those that have suffered from structural racism and policies that have left them economically and socially isolated, can obtain financial investment.

Also, in 2017, the institute established the Babbitt Center for Land and Water Policy, which seeks to advance the integration of land and water management to meet the current and future water needs in the Colorado River Basin.

In September 2021, the Centre supported a report on "Groundwater and Urban Growth in the San Joaquin Valley".

Among the topics covered by the Lincoln Institute are land policy as it relates to property taxes, assessments, valuation, and tax limitation measures; local public finance; property rights; land conservation, climate change, and smart growth; the role of the university in urban environments; planning, land use regulation, and development incentives; and community development—including community land trusts, inclusionary zoning, and community benefit agreements.

In March 2021, the institute established a fellowship in Public Administration with Claremont Graduate University.

Partners
The Institute works together with different international partners on projects, education and research. 
 Sonoran Institute
 Regional Plan Association
 Harvard University Graduate School of Design
 American Planning Association
 Ford Foundation
 Organization for Economic Cooperation and Development
 Institute for Housing and Urban Development Studies (IHS) of Erasmus University Rotterdam
 UN-Habitat
 New York University
 Claremont Graduate University
 University of Washington.

References

External links
 Official website

Organizations based in Cambridge, Massachusetts
Think tanks established in 1974
Think tanks based in the United States
Urban planning in the United States
Georgist organizations